The UT Arlington Mavericks softball team is a varsity intercollegiate athletic team of the University of Texas at Arlington in Arlington, Texas, United States. The team will be a member Western Athletic Conference in 2023, which is part of the National Collegiate Athletic Association's Division I. The team plays its home games at Allan Saxe Field in Arlington, Texas.

History

UTA began playing intercollegiate softball in time for the fall 1973 season, under Coach Jody Conradt, who was also the volleyball and basketball coach. In their first season as members of the AIAW, UTA went 11–6 and finished 5th in the AIAW State Tournament. The Mavericks would play in the AIAW until joining the NCAA for the 1981–82 athletic season. During that time, UTA won two AIAW State titles and advanced to the AIAW Women's College World Series each time (1976 and 1977). The highest finish was an eighth-place finish in the Spring of 1976, when they went 2–2.

Shortly after UTA joined the NCAA, they began play in the Southland Conference and won regular season conference championships in 1983, 1986, 1989, 2003 and 2007, while finishing as runners-up in 1985, 1987, 1988, 1990, 1993, 2008 and 2011. UTA has not had the same success in the conference tournament, where they have compiled a record of 27–39. Their only tournament championship came in 2003, while they have finished as the tournament runners-up in 1983, 1987 and 2006.

The watershed moment for the Mavericks program came in the 2003 NCAA Tournament. UTA was the 7th seed in the 8-team Gainesville Regional. UTA went 2–2, with a 1–0 win over Florida State, followed by a 2–0 win over host Florida. UTA's first loss occurred to eventual Regional champion Oklahoma, 6–2. In the following game, they were eliminated by Oregon State 2–0.

For the 2013 season, UTA played in the Western Athletic Conference. In the 2014 season, UTA began participation as members of the Sun Belt Conference.

UTA, despite leaving the Southland Conference after the 2012 season, remains tied in the conference in total all-conference selections with 108 and still leads in first team all-conference selections with 43.

Season-by-season results

See also
 List of NCAA Division I softball programs

References

External links